is an onsen resort in Iwaki, Fukushima Prefecture in Japan.

History
Although known since the Nara period, the hot springs at Iwaki developed with borehole drilling in the Jōban Coal Fields in the Meiji period. To the west of the traditional onsen town is the Spa Resort Hawaiians.

See also 
Three Ancient Springs

External links 
 

Hot springs of Fukushima Prefecture
Spa towns in Japan
Tourist attractions in Fukushima Prefecture
Iwaki, Fukushima